Marko Mijailović (born 14 August 1997) is a Serbian football defender who plays for Voždovac. 

He is the younger brother of Srđan Mijailović.

Club career

Red Star Belgrade
Born in Užice, Mijailović came throw the Red Star Belgrade youth categories. He joined the first team in 2014 under coach Nenad Lalatović. He made his senior debut for the team, replacing Bogdan Planić in a reval match against Udinese at the Rajko Mitić Stadium on 15 November 2014. Later same month, Mijailović stayed on the bench as an unused substitution in 14 fixture match of the 2014–15 Serbian SuperLiga season against OFK Beograd. In the winter break off-season, Mijailović was optionally loaned to the Serbian First League side Kolubara, but also stayed with youth team for the whole 2015. Mijailović was with the first team for several friendly games during 2015, including matches against OFK Bor, Gračanica and Mordovia Saransk.

After fully recovery from an injury he earned in early 2016, Mijailović was loaned to Bežanija, where he noted 9 appearances with a goal until the end of season. In summer 2016, Mijailović extended his loan for the 2016–17 season. Although he spent the mid-season training with Red Star, head coach Miodrag Božović decided to leave him with Bežanija until the end of season. During the season, Mijailović noted 28 First League, scoring 1 goal, and also played a cup match against Vojvodina.

Rad
On 18 August 2017, Mijailović joined Rad as a free agent. He officially promoted several days later on Thursday 24 August, peening a three-year contract with new club.

Voždovac
On 1 July 2021, he joined Voždovac.

International career
Mijailović has been called in Serbian national team selections since 2012. He was a member of selections under 16, 17 and 18 years old between 2012 and 2016. In November 2016, Mijailović was called into the Serbia U20 squad under coach Nenad Lalatović, where he made his debut in a match against Montenegro.

Mijailović made his debut for Serbia national football team on 25 January 2023 in a friendly match against USA. Serbia won the game 2 – 1, with him being a starter.

Career statistics

Club

International

References

External links
 
 
 

1997 births
Living people
Sportspeople from Užice
Association football defenders
Serbian footballers
Serbia youth international footballers
Serbia international footballers
Red Star Belgrade footballers
FK Kolubara players
FK Bežanija players
FK Rad players
FK Mačva Šabac players
FK Voždovac players
Serbian SuperLiga players
Serbian First League players